Live is a 2000 reggae album by Luciano, the Jamaican second-generation roots reggae artist and poet.

CD information
Format: Compact Disc (05464516022)
Stereo: Stereo
Pieces in Set: 1
Catalog #: VP1602
Desc: Performer

Track listing
 Messenger
 Never Give Up My Pride
 Who Could It Be
 How Can You
 He Is My Friend
 Good God
 Heaven Help Us All
 What We Need Is Love
 Your World And Mine
 Crazy Baldheads
 Running Away
 War
 It's Me Again Jah
 Lord Give Me Strength
 In This Together
 Over The Hills

2000 live albums
Luciano (singer) albums
Live reggae albums